Apricena Città is a railway station serving the town of Apricena, in the region of Apulia, southern Italy. The station is located on the San Severo–Peschici railway. The train services are operated by Ferrovie del Gargano. The station opened on 14 December 2014 as part of the first phase of the new direct line between San Severo and San Nicandro Garganico. The second phase, from Apricena Città to San Nicandro Garganico opened on 13 June 2016.

Train services
The station is served by the following services:

Regional services (Treno regionale) Foggia - San Severo - Apricena - Rodi - Peschichi

See also

History of rail transport in Italy
List of railway stations in Apulia
Rail transport in Italy
Railway stations in Italy

References

External links

Railway stations in Apulia
Railway stations opened in 2014